The men's keirin at the 2019 European Games was held at the Minsk Velodrome on 30 June 2019.

Results

First round
The first two riders in each heat qualified to the second round, all other riders advanced to the first round repechages.

Heat 1

Heat 2

Heat 3

Heat 4

First round repechage
The first rider in each heat qualified to the second round.

Heat 1

Heat 2

Heat 3

Heat 4

Second round
The first three riders in each heat qualified to final 1–6, all other riders advanced to final 7–12.

Heat 1

Heat 2

Finals
Small final

Final

References

Men's keirin